Heusner is a German surname. Notable people with the surname include:

Bill Heusner (1927–2002), American swimmer
Karl Eduard Heusner (1843–1891), Vice-Admiral of the German Imperial Navy
Ludwig Heusner (1843–1916), German surgeon

See also
Heusler

German-language surnames